The Student Federation of the University of Ottawa (also known as the SFUO) was the official students' union representing undergraduate students of the University of Ottawa from 1969 to 2018.

The Student Federation of the University of Ottawa was a bilingual entity, and its French-language name and acronym (FÉUO) had equal standing. It was a not-for-profit organization, incorporated under the Corporations' Act of Ontario.

On August 9, 2018, La Rotonde, the university's French-language newspaper, reported that the Ottawa Police Service was investigating members of the SFUO and its executive for fraud. Subsequently, on August 10, the university announced it was withholding their funding until an audit into the allegations could be completed.

On September 25, 2018, the University of Ottawa provided the Federation with a 90-day notice of termination of their contract, citing insufficient progress and further allegations of workplace misconduct, internal conflict, and improper governance. The announcement noted that, as of December 24th, 2018, the Federation would no longer be recognized as the official representative of students, and invited students who wished to establish successor organizations to come forward.

A referendum was held in February 2019 to determine whether the SFUO would be reinstated as the official undergraduate student union, or whether a new organization - the University of Ottawa Students' Union (UOSU) - would take its place. On February 11, 2019, the University of Ottawa announced that the University of Ottawa Students' Union had won the referendum to become the official undergraduate student union.

The SFUO offices closed on April 10, 2019. An equitable court receiver has been appointed to officially dissolve the federation.

Governance
The highest governing body of the SFUO was the Board of Administration (BoA). The BoA was composed of 34 members: the six executive members, 25 faculty representatives, one special student representative, one international student representative, and one Indigenous student representative. All the executive and faculty representative positions were directly elected. The BoA met a month

The second-highest governing body of the SFUO was the General Assembly (GA), which was open to all students. Quorum for the GA was set at 0.75% of the student population - about 240 students.

Finances
According to auditors Deloitte, the Student Federation collected $5,103,066 from all 36,068 registered students alone during the 2015 session. A breakdown of the SFUO levies (services, initiatives and more) can be found on the University of Ottawa's Registrar Page. The executives have a salary of $35,500, and also covers the cost of up to 2 courses per semester as well as cell phone costs.

Businesses
At the time of its dissolution, the SFUO owned four student-run businesses:

PIVIK
A convenience store located in the University Centre, which sold groceries and some school supplies. It also sold some hot food.

The Agora Bookstore
The Agora Bookstore was created in 1999 with the goal of providing cheaper textbooks. In 2006, students voted in a referendum to maintain a levy $9 per full-time student per semester to subsidize the Agora. The Agora, however, was not allowed to sell textbooks on campus, and as such is located on Besserer Street.

1848
From 1981 to 2002, the SFUO owned and operated a bar located within the University Centre called "The Equinox", later shortened to just "The Nox". It was closed after having lost around $500,000 in its final 5 years of operation. The SFUO briefly opened a bar called The Universe City Lounge above the Agora Bookstore, but it was closed after one year of operation. In 2006, the SFUO opened a new bar called 1848 in the University Centre.

Café Alt
Located in the basement of Simard Hall, Café Alt opened in October 2008 as a green and fair-trade student café with a deli sandwich bar, as well as a variety of fair trade coffees, after being abandoned by Chartwells, the university's food provider, in 2007. Café Alt's basement is also home to three smaller student associations; GAIA, the Geography students' association, AÉDF (Association des Étudiants du Département de français), and the Students' Association of the Faculty of Arts, which manages event booking in the space.

Clubs
The SFUO is home to over 250 cultural, religious, political/social justice, philanthropic/humanitarian, recreational and academic clubs on campus. The SFUO had subsidised clubs up to $1000 each year. This was increased to $2000 during the 2015-16 school year. During the 2016–17 school year, clubs had their funding cut entirely due to the SFUO's austerity measures.

Each club must register at the beginning of each academic year to be recognized and to receive the benefits of being a SFUO club.

Services
The SFUO also ran twelve different services.

Bike Coop
The SFUO Bike Co-op is meant to be a space for bicycle enthusiasts. The Bike Co-op offers guided workshops and accessible biking resources.

Bilingualism Centre
The SFUO Bilingualism Centre offers the opportunity to practice a second language in a discussion group, with a tutor, and during cultural events. It also advocates for language rights on campus.

Centre for Students with Disabilities
The SFUO Centre for Students with Disabilities (CSD) is a centre for education and advocacy, as well as a drop-in space. The CSD offers events, services, and campaigns throughout the year focused on disability and accessibility.

Food Bank
The SFUO Food Bank offers students access to food at all times. It also aims to raise awareness of food security issues and attempt to break down the stigma surrounding food insecurity in Canada.

Foot Patrol
The SFUO Foot Patrol is a student-run volunteer-based safe walk service offered to all students and members of the university community. Foot Patrol volunteers pick up students and walk with them anywhere within a 45-minute walking radius around main and RGN campuses and ride on several OCTranspo routes.

International House
The SFUO International House is a service designed to respond to the cultural, social, academic, and economic needs of international students and the general student population at the University of Ottawa.

Peer Help Centre
The SFUO Peer Help Centre provides the student community with academic, personal, and social support, which is achieved through short-term peer consultation. The Peer Help Centre offers uOttawa students a comfortable place to turn to in a time of need.

Pride Centre
The SFUO Pride Centre strives to promote a culture of affirmation through sex-positivity, and celebrate diversity of gender, sex, and sexuality both on and off campus. It offers students with resources as well as organizing events such as the annual Pride Week.

Student Rights Centre
The SFUO Appeal Centre offers help and support to students who wish to appeal decisions made by the administration of the University of Ottawa. This free service also assists and guides students who wish to file a complaint against or to receive assistance in dealing with the University of Ottawa.

Sustainable Development Centre
The SFUO Sustainable Development Centre aims to minimize the ecological footprint of the school and to change the mindset of students about sustainability and the ecological crisis. The centre not only runs its own projects, but also acts as a resource and support centre for environmental and social justice groups on campus.

University of Ottawa Student Emergency Response Team (UOSERT)
UOSERT provides 24/7 volunteer medical emergency services during the fall and winter terms.

Women's Resource Centre
The SFUO Women's Resource Centre is an inclusive, non-judgmental, pro-choice, feminist drop-in space that supports community members to work together to challenge gender oppression. They offer resources, events and campaigns to challenge gender oppression.

Campaigns

In My Skin 
In My Skin is an anti-racism campaign launched by the SFUO that seeks to tackle and raise awareness on racial issues faced on campus by many students of colour, while effectively educating them on how to challenge racism. In My Skin is an active campaign that creates various types of events such as a self-expression campaign, where students post a picture of themselves with a sign written "In My Skin" with a short quote about how they are not defined by racism, discussion groups, panels, and spoken word poetry slams. Additionally, these events seek to be inclusive to student of colour.

Task Force Against Rape Culture 
Task Force Against Rape Culture is a response campaign by the Student Federation and the Graduate Student Association, which seeks to address sexual violence occurring at the University of Ottawa. Rape culture is defined as the social attitude that allows for rape to be normalized, trivialized, and even celebrated in some cases. This campaign attempts to challenge and fight sexism, misogyny and other forms of sexual violence experienced, on and off campus at the University of Ottawa, to effectively end rape culture.

Fossil Free uOttawa 
Fossil Free uOttawa is an active campaign that promotes the negative impact of fossil fuel companies. Fossil Free uOttawa seeks to divest University of Ottawa from the very destructive fossil fuel industry by urging the Board of Governors to address the threat of climate change.

The 5 Demands: Decolonize uOttawa 
The 5 Demands for the decolonization of the University of Ottawa is a collaborative campaign between the Indigenous Students' Association (ISA), the Indigenous and Canadian Studies Students' Association (ICSSA), and the Student Federation. The campaign lists 5 specific demands. The first demand is requesting the university to teach the Algonquin language for an undergraduate credit once every academic year. The second demand is seeking to increase Indigenous scholarships. The third demand is asking to create an Indigenous portal on the university's website. The fourth demand seeks for the university to recognize the Algonquin Nation throughout the physical landscape of the university. The final demand consists of three parts, part A demands the use of Aboriginal be replaced by Indigenous in all uses associated with the Aboriginal Studies Program; part B seeks to review the Aboriginal Studies Program in order to improve the French language offerings; part C requests that at least one course per semester be specifically related to the culture, history, politics, and spirituality of the Algonquin Nation.

Generation Vote 
The Generation to Vote is a campaign that encourages young people to vote with the goal of putting students' needs on government agendas. This campaign was launched in spring 2014 before the Ontario provincial election by the Canadian Federation of Students-Ontario. The objective was to call on the province's political parties to take action on issues relevant to youth and students. Some issues advocated were lower tuition fees, end illegal college and university ancillary fees, extend OHIP health coverage to international students, end unpaid internships, and improve access to public transit for students.

The Hikes Stop Here 
The Hikes Stop Here campaign was launched in 2013 in response to the announcement of the Ontario provincial tuition framework. The framework allows tuition to increase annually up to three percent for most general programs and up to five percent for high demand and graduate levels programs. There is also no regulation for international students tuition fees in the framework. The Campaign focuses on advocating to the Ontario government that they must take action by cancelling the current framework and address the rising cost of tuition. The campaign demands that tuition fees be reduced by 30 percent for all students and that a long-term plan be installed to publicly fund college and university education.

Education is a Right 
The Education is a Right campaign is based on the idea that public education in Canada is a basic right for all. The campaign advocates for a Canadian system of post secondary education be accessible to everyone and be of high quality. The goals of the campaign are the implementation of the national post-secondary education act, to dedicate federal funding for post-secondary education, to restore the federal funds to account for the underfunding in the past decades and to expand the non-repayable grants in order to eliminate student loans. The campaign also addresses the obstacles that graduate, international and Aboriginal students face.

No Means No 
The No Means No campaign is an effort to end rape and sexual violence in communities and on university campuses. This campaign raises awareness about sexual violence, rape, and promotes consent and encourages students to be active and prevent sexual violence. The campaign, developed over two decades ago aims to change the culture surrounding acquaintance rape and dating violence in Canada. Through public education the campaign helps people understand their rights and responsibilities in sexual relationships.

Canadian Federation of Students affiliation
The SFUO is Local 41 of the Canadian Federation of Students, the same local number it held from 1985 to 1994.

In the summer of 2008, a committee was formed to create a report on national student organizations and their benefits. The vast majority of this report was about the Canadian Federation of Students.

Consequently, the SFUO Board of Administration voted in favor of becoming prospective members of the Canadian Federation of Students. Later, in November 2008, the SFUO joined the Canadian Federation of Students in a referendum question that brought out 22% of the voting population. Approximately 52% of those who voted in this election were in favour of the referendum.

Elections
Elections for the SFUO executive and Board of Administration are held annually in February. At that time, all 6 executive positions and 25 faculty representative positions are elected. The elections for the undergraduate Board of Governors representatives and the University Senate student representatives are also held at the same time.

SFUO elections are conducted using the first-past-the-post system, and students vote using paper ballots at polling stations across campus. The SFUO elections office is headed by the Chief Electoral Officer, appointed by the BoA's Elections Committee and then ratified by the BoA. No members of the SFUO, BoA or executive are allowed to do any work for the elections office.

Voter turnout has generally averaged around 11–12% in the last couple decades, the notable exception being 2009 and 2010, where voter turnout was over 20% both years as the SFUO used online voting. The record-low voter turnout was 5.7% in 1993.

Past presidents of the organization have included Marcel Prud'homme (1958–59), André Ouellet (1959–60), Allan Rock (1969–70), Hugh Segal (1970–71), Denis Paradis (1974–75), Mauril Bélanger (1977–79), Anne McGrath (1979–80), Bernard Drainville (1984–85), Gilles Marchildon (1987–88), Maxime Pedneaud-Jobin (1990–91) and Guy Caron (1992–94).

General Assemblies
General Assemblies existed since the incorporation of the SFUO in 1969, yet during the 20th century they were only used as emergency measures and in the 1990s General Assemblies fell out of use. In November 2013, a referendum calling for the creation of the General Assembly (GA) of the SFUO failed, having not met the minimum turnout requirement of 4%, despite the yes receiving 84% of the vote. Several students opposed the creation of the GA, citing cost concerns, as well as concerns that the GA quorum of 1% would not be properly representative of the student population. The petition for the referendum was launched by the Marxist Students' Association. A second referendum was held along with the General Elections in 2014, and passed, bringing back General Assemblies after about twenty years of absence.

The first SFUO General Assembly of the 21st century was held in November 2014. It failed to meet quorum and all the motions presented were later approved by the BoA, except for the motion calling for the SFUO to study the possibility of a strike. That motion was tabled indefinitely by the BoA in the hope that it would presented again at the next GA. Because the GA never met quorum, it became a Q&A period with the executive. That period was rather heated, with one student being quoted as saying that: "Instead of having a participatory democracy, we were just an audience and that was our feeling, we didn't feel empowered".

Quorum has been met twice, once in 1980 in reaction to a large tuition increase that led to a resolution to be passed to implement a tuition boycott, and again in March 2017 when over 280 students showed up during the 2017 Winter General Assembly to repeal an executive pay raise of 18%.

Controversies

"In My Skin" scandal
The Executives of the Student Federation of the University of Ottawa planned an event called "In My Skin" to be held on March 4, 2014. The event sought to foster two conversations, according to its organizers: each group was to discuss the benefits and disadvantages that racialized and non-racialized students face in dealing with institutional racism. It was planned that students would be split into "breakout groups", where they would discuss discrimination and white privilege and then would regroup to discuss the issues as a whole.

There was a major backlash from students who saw this event as segregation and "reverse racism" because it would split students into different rooms based on skin colours.

The Facebook event and debate were shut down and Nicole Desnoyers, Vice President Equity, released a statement explaining that there was no intention of segregation and racism on the part of the SFUO.

Fireworks scandal 
In summer 2014, VP Social Ikram Hamoud decided to hold a fireworks display at the closing ceremony of that year's 101 Week. To that end, the SFUO purchased 10,000 dollars worth of fireworks. Hamoud was then notified by the City of Ottawa that they wouldn't be able to use the fireworks due to safety concerns. This caused a lot of controversy. Several of the Federated Bodies VP Socials accused Hamoud of failing to work with the Social Round Table. This, as well as concerns about the VP Social's job performance, led to an attempt at launching an impeachment referendum. In part because of its vocal criticism of the purchase, the Facebook group SFUO Does Not Represent Me gained substantial popularity. The 2014 101 Week finished with a budget deficit of almost $80,000.

Crashing of ARC opening ceremony 
A group of students, led by several members of the executive, crashed the opening ceremony of the Advanced Research Complex (ARC) in September 2014. The group stood behind the podium with a banner calling for lower tuition fees, and the VP University Affairs interrupted [Reza Moridi]'s speech to read a statement. This protest drew criticism from many students, including several executive members of the Science Students' Association, who wrote a letter to the Fulcrum stating that: "The fact that the 'student representative' felt it necessary to protest rising tuition fees on the opening of (Dr. André Lalonde's) building is offensive to many of us. We feel that it is not only disrespectful to his memory and his legacy as a student-oriented dean, but also because this building should be celebrated for what it is, instead of criticised for what it is not."

Yoga as cultural appropriation 

In November 2015, the SFUO cancelled the free yoga classes being put on by the Centre for Students with Disabilities over concerns of cultural appropriation. The news provoked a large backlash from students, and received coverage by international media. The free class was subsequently reinstated with the hiring of an Indian-Canadian instructor. "Cultural issues" were the primary concern cited in an email from the University of Ottawa's Centre for Students with Disabilities, run by the SFUO, to the Ottawa Sun.
"While yoga is a really great idea and accessible and great for students ... there are cultural issues of implication involved in the practice. [Some cultures] have experienced oppression, cultural genocide and diasporas due to colonialism and western supremacy ... we need to be mindful of this and how we express ourselves while practising yoga."
Less than a week later, the Sun reported that the SFUO had changed course and issued a statement attributing declining attendance and a need to "ensure that students' money and resources was being used in a responsible and efficient way," as the reason for the cancellation.

Allegations of executives illegally obtaining U-Passes 
U-Passes are Ottawa-Gatineau area public transportation passes that students are required to buy into as part of their membership of the SFUO if they qualify. To be eligible, a uOttawa student must be a full-time undergraduate or graduate student. Students are able to opt out under certain criteria, such as living outside of the public transit service area. In early 2017 allegations were made that the SFUO executives, who cannot qualify for the U-Passes because they must be part-time students, had obtained and were using U-Passes. Complaints were made against VP social Hadi Wess, VP university affairs Vanessa Dorimain, VP finance Rizki Rachiq, and VP equity Morissa Ellis. They were investigated by the BoA Disciplinary Committee, which found that indeed Wess, Dorimain, and Ellis had obtained U-Passes. Ellis had obtained the U-Pass by registering for five classes, which contravened with the SFUO constitution on the maximum course load for executives. She later dropped the excess classes to become a part-time student, but did not return the U-Pass as required. Dorimain was found to not qualify for a U-Pass, but as part of her role she worked on the U-Pass portfolio and had access to U-Passes that were not distributed due to "errors". Wess was found to be "qualified" for the U-Pass but the disciplinary committee did not disclose how. He was a part-time student and part-time students do not qualify. During the BoA meeting at the Roger Guindon Campus on April 2, 2017, the Faculty of Medicine representative Lukas Hashem asked for clarification as to how Wess could qualify but no answer was given. The disciplinary committee did not recommend sanctions against those involved.

18% exec pay raise, stripping of General Assembly legislative power 
In February 2017, the SFUO began discussion about raising executive salaries from $33500 to $39700, an increase of 18%, despite the poor financial condition and bankruptcy of the student union in 2016. Students criticized continual lack of funding to clubs, the low wages of other SFUO employees, and accused SFUO executives of conflict of interest. Despite widespread online controversy of the proposal, it was passed, with SFUO executives citing making less than other university student federation executives and dependent children as reasons for the raise. On March 14, the Winter 2017 general assembly met quorum for the first time since 1980, with over 280 students showing up to repeal the executives' pay raise.

After the motion passed, with the added condition that execs not be allowed to raise their own salaries any more than what other SFUO workers' salaries have been raised, some members of the executive claimed that the legislative power of the GA had been stripped previously and any motion passed would still have to be passed by the Board of Administration. Students argued that they could not trust the BoA to make decisions for them that reflected what had happened during the GA, and expressed worry that BoA meetings are not recorded or made available to the public. After further review, it was clarified that since the decision to repeal the pay raise did not affect bylaws or constitution, the decision of the GA was final.

At the BoA meeting on April 2, 2017, the executive aimed to strip of the GA of its remaining powers, but several BoA members led by engineering representative Jeffrey Colin, special student representative David Gakwerere, and medicine representative Lukas Hashem managed to amend it so that the BoA would require a two thirds super majority to repeal motions passed at the GA.

Fraud allegations 
In August 2018, allegations of fraud committed by SFUO executives and an SFUO employee surfaced with the online circulation of a police report filed by outgoing SFUO president, Hadi Wess. The police report outlines the discovery of purchases carried out by the president and the executive manager. As of August 10, 2018, the University of Ottawa issued a formal statement, announcing that it would take over the management of student levies until the results of a forensic audit were released.

After learning of allegations of financial mismanagement involving members of the SFUO executive and a SFUO staff member, the university requested that the Federation conduct a forensic audit. At the same time, the university notified the SFUO that uOttawa would withhold the fees that it collects from students on behalf of the Federation, pending the outcome of the forensic audit and restored University confidence in the proper financial management of student fees. Measures have been put in place to ensure the continuity of financial operations until the results of the audit become available. Since then, the university has learned of additional allegations of improper governance, mismanagement, internal conflict and workplace misconduct within the SFUO. University representatives expressed the institution's growing concerns about these allegations in letters to, and in two meetings with, the SFUO executive. The university made it clear to the SFUO executive that it would be required to take steps to restore the university's confidence in the Federation's ability to responsibly conduct its internal affairs. the university has not been satisfied with the Federation's progress.

The agreement between the university and the SFUO stipulates that either party may terminate the agreement by giving the other party three months' written notice. Therefore, on December 24, 2018, following termination of the agreement, the university will no longer recognize the SFUO as the exclusive association representing undergraduate students and will no longer collect fees from students on behalf of the Federation.

On November 7, 2018, the SFUO released the completed audit from PwC to the public. On November 8, 2018, the University of Ottawa responded by sending an email to students indicating the report "has not restored the university's confidence in the SFUO's ability to practice sound financial management." They reiterated their intention to terminate the University of Ottawa-SFUO agreement.

See also
List of Ontario students' associations
History of the Student Federation of the University of Ottawa
Canadian Federation of Students

References

External links

University of Ottawa
Ottawa
1969 establishments in Ontario
2018 disestablishments in Ontario
Student government